Pervillaea is a genus of plants in the family Apocynaceae, first described as a genus in 1844. It is native to Mauritius and Madagascar in the Indian Ocean.

Species
 Pervillaea brevirostris Klack. -  Mauritius 
 Pervillaea decaryi (Choux) Klack. - Madagascar
 Pervillaea phillipsonii Klack. - Madagascar
 Pervillaea tomentosa Decne. - Madagascar
 Pervillaea venenata (Baill.) Klack. - Madagascar

References

Secamonoideae
Apocynaceae genera
Taxa named by Joseph Decaisne